Gladys Chepkirui Ngetich (born c.1991) is a Kenyan engineer, and a Rhodes scholar, pursuing a doctorate degree in aerospace engineering at the University of Oxford, in the United Kingdom. She is the recipient of the Tanenbaum Fellowship and the Babaroa Excellence Award.

Background and education
Ngetich was born in Amalo Village, Nakuru County. She attended Lelaibei Primary School in Olenguruone. She studied at Mercy Girls' Secondary School in Kericho. She was admitted to the Jomo Kenyatta University of Agriculture and Technology, graduating with a Bachelor of Science degree in mechanical engineering, in 2013.

In 2015, Ngetich joined the University of Oxford on a Rhodes Scholarship to pursue a doctoral degree in Aerospace Engineering. In 2016, she earned a Tanenbaum Fellowship, an annual fellowship awarded to Rhodes scholars for a multifaceted program in Israel. In 2018, Ngetich was named a Skoll World Forum Fellow for the work she is doing in Kenya to empower girls and women. She also tutors engineering undergraduate students at Oriel College.

Achievements/Awards
In 2018, Ngetich was credited with a patent in collaboration with Rolls-Royce Plc. Her research work has been in BBC Science and the Oxford Science Blog and Medium. She received the ASME IGTI Young Engineer Turbo Expo Participation Award, for her paper at the 2018 Annual American Society of Mechanical Engineers (ASME) conference.

Ngetich is the co-founder of the ILUU, a Nairobi-based non-profit that aims to inspire girls and women.

In September 2018, Business Daily Africa named Ngitech among its "Top 40 Under 40 Women in Kenya in 2018". In 2019 she started investigating sustainable space science using a Schmidt Science Fellowship.

Personal life 
As profiled in Nature, Ngetich enjoys running, Bongo dance music and Swahili hip-hop, and keeping a clutter-free work space.

See also
 Frannie Léautier
 Emily Orwaru
 Josephine Wapakabulo

References

External links 
 Brief Video Presentation by Gladys Ngetich, PhD. Published on 14 November 2019.

21st-century Kenyan women scientists
21st-century Kenyan scientists
21st-century women engineers
Kenyan engineers
Kenyan women engineers
Aerospace engineers
Women aerospace engineers
Mechanical engineers
Alumni of the University of Oxford
Jomo Kenyatta University of Agriculture and Technology alumni
Kalenjin people
People from Nakuru County
1991 births
Living people